Bintan Regency (formerly Riau Islands Regency) is an administrative area in the Riau Islands Province of Indonesia. Bintan Regency includes all of Bintan Island (except for the city of Tanjung Pinang which is separately administered as an autonomous area of the island) and also includes many outlying islands including the Tambelan Archipelago and Badas Islands situated between Bintan and West Kalimantan.

Location
The Island is located 40 kilometres from Singapore, with an area of 1,462.77 km2, and it has a population of around 330,000 at the 2010 Census (including Tanjung Pinang), which by the 2020 Census had risen to 387,181. These population figures include outlying islands and archipelagoes that are included within Bintan Regency. Famous places in Bintan include Trikora Beach, on the east coast, and the international Bintan Resorts.

Administration
The Regency (excluding the city of Tanjung Pinang) is divided into ten districts (kecamatan) – tabulated below with their areas and their populations at the 2010 Census and 2020 Census. The table also includes the numbers of administrative villages (rural desa and urban kelurahan) in each district, and its postal code.

Notes:
(a) Bintan Pesisir and Mantang districts comprise numerous islands lying to the east and south respectively of Bintan Island, but do not include any part of that island itself.
(b) Tambelan district comprises the Tambelan Archipelago and Badas Islands situated between Bintan and West Kalimantan.

Demography

Religion

Islam is the dominant religion in the city, with 86.88% of the total population identify themselves as Muslim. Other religions are Christianity, which forms 7.52% of the total population, Buddhism, which forms 5.37% of the total population, Hinduism, which forms 0.09% of the total population and Confucianism, which forms 0.38% of the total population.

Airports
Besides Raja Haji Fisabilillah Airport is near Tanjung Pinang in the south of the island, since 2012 a private company has been building an airport at Lagoi in the north of the island to facilitates tourism with investment $80 to $100 million; it is now predicted to be operational by the end of 2021.

References

External links
 

 
Islands of Indonesia
Populated places in Indonesia